Pyemotes is a genus of mites.

It is divided into scolyti and ventricosus groups.

It includes the species:
 Pyemotes dryas
 Pyemotes herfsi
 Pyemotes scolyti
 Pyemotes tritici
 Pyemotes ventricosus

References

Trombidiformes genera